Psychedelic Revolution is a double album by Julian Cope, released in 2012 on Head Heritage. It is Cope's twenty-seventh solo album and contains 11 songs across two half-hour-long CDs. Cope dedicated the album to Che Guevara and Leila Khaled.

Track listing

Personnel

Julian Cope — vocals, electric guitar, acoustic guitar, Spanish guitar, Mellotron, Selmer Omnichord, 26" and 30" marching bass drums, electric piano, Musser glockenspiel, cello on "Hooded & Benign", producer, directed by, photography, artwork
Christopher Patrick "Holy" McGrail — synthesizer, recording technology, mastering engineer, album design
Adam "Randy Apostle" Whittaker — vocals, recording technology
Ady "Acoustika" Fletcher — vocals
Chris "Christophe F." Farrell — vocals
Andrew "Common Era" Johnstone — vocals
Big Nige — 30" marching bass drum
Lucy Brownhills — lead vocals on "Psychedelic Revolution"
Antony "Antronhy de La O " Hodgkinson — synthesizer on "Psychedelic Revolution"

References

External links
Psychedelic Revolution on Discogs.com

2012 albums
Julian Cope albums